Abdelkader Amrani (born 3 January 1956) is an Algerian football manager and the current head coach of ASO Chlef.

He trained WA Tlemcen, ASO Chlef, USM Alger, USM Blida, USM Annaba, CA Bordj Bou Arréridj, JS Saoura, MO Béjaïa, ES Sétif, CR Belouizdad and CS Constantine.

Managerial statistics

Titles
As a coach
Algerian Cup in 1998 with WA Tlemcen
Algerian Cup in 2005 with ASO Chlef
Algerian Cup in 2015 with MO Béjaïa
Algerian Cup in 2019 with CR Belouizdad
Algerian Ligue Professionnelle 1 in 2018 with CS Constantine

References

External links
 

1956 births
Living people
Algerian football managers
WA Tlemcen managers
MC Oran managers
ES Mostaganem managers
GC Mascara managers
ASO Chlef managers
USM Alger managers
USM Blida managers
USM Annaba managers
CA Bordj Bou Arréridj managers
JS Saoura managers
MO Béjaïa managers
Al-Raed FC managers
ES Sétif managers
CS Constantine managers
CR Belouizdad managers
Difaâ Hassani El Jadidi managers
MC Alger managers
Algerian Ligue Professionnelle 1 managers
Tunisian Ligue Professionnelle 1 managers
Algerian expatriate football managers
Algerian expatriate sportspeople in Saudi Arabia
Expatriate football managers in Saudi Arabia
Algerian expatriate sportspeople in Morocco
Expatriate football managers in Morocco
21st-century Algerian people